John Kennedy, 7th Earl of Cassilis, PC (November 1653 – 23 July 1701) was a Scottish peer, the son of John Kennedy, 6th Earl of Cassilis.

He succeeded to the titles of 9th Lord Kennedy and 7th Earl of Cassillis on 22 September 1668. He was one of the commission exercising the office of Treasurer of Scotland between 1689 and 1695. On his death, his titles went to his grandson, as his first son, Lord Kennedy, had predeceased him. Kennedy was a keen freemason, belonging to the Kilwinning Lodge.

Family
He married Lady Susannah Hamilton, daughter of  James Hamilton, 1st Duke of Hamilton, on 26 December 1668. They had three children:
 William Kennedy, Master of Cassilis (b.1668)
John Kennedy, Lord Kennedy (ca. 1672–1700), who married Elizabeth Hutchinson and had one son, John who became the 8th Earl of Cassilis.
Anne Kennedy (bef. 1679–1699)

He married Mary Fox, on 27 February 1697 or 1698. They had three children:
Hon. James Kennedy (b. 1701 – d. 1759)
Lady Elizabeth Kennedy (b. 1701)
Lady Mary Kennedy (b. 1701)

References

1653 births
1701 deaths
Earls of Cassilis
Place of birth missing
Place of death missing
John
Scottish Freemasons
Members of the Convention of the Estates of Scotland 1689
Commissioners of the Treasury of Scotland